Umer Naru is a Pakistani television and theatre actor.

Filmography

Theatre 
   The Taming of the Shrew,  Globe Theatre  

 Twins Apart

Film

Television

References 

Pakistani male television actors
Year of birth missing (living people)
Living people
21st-century Pakistani male actors